Alltwalis is a village in Carmarthen, Carmarthenshire, Wales. It has a wind farm called Alltwalis Wind Farm.

References

External links

Community Centre Yr Hen Ysgol
Alltwalis Wind Farm
What's in a Name of Alltwalis

Villages in Carmarthenshire